Scientific Computer Applications Inc. (SCAI) is a privately held, American company based in Tulsa, Oklahoma. SCAI develops and markets scientific software focused on the Oil exploration and production segment of the petroleum industry.

Scientific Computer Applications, Inc. (SCAI) was established in 1969 as an Oil & Gas Consulting firm by Professional engineering Petroleum Consultant Richard Banks, a graduate of the Colorado School of Mines and the University of Texas.

SCAI markets contour map software that generates single surface, multiple surfaces, contour mapping, and Reservoir Integration applications for the Personal computer.

History
Dick Banks, a Colorado School of Mines graduate, and Joe Sukkar, Ph.D, began a partnership in 1969 with the development of a contour mapping software package based on Triangulation (topology).  Triangulation is more rigorous than gridded contour map software because the original data points are always honored, and not estimated as in Grid map software.

See also
Fred Meissner
Geographic information system
List of geographic information systems software
Comparison of geographic information systems software
Scientific software
List of information graphics software
Oil reserves
Reservoir engineering
Extraction of petroleum

References 

 

Software companies based in Oklahoma
Companies based in Tulsa, Oklahoma
Software companies established in 1969
Non-renewable resource companies established in 1969
1969 establishments in Oklahoma
Privately held companies based in Oklahoma
Defunct software companies of the United States